Inna Vitalievna Kapishina (born December 30, 1984) is a Belarusian former swimmer, who specialized in breaststroke events. She is a multiple-time Belarusian champion and three-time national record holder in her respective discipline (50, 100, and 200 m).

Kapishina made her Olympic debut at the 2004 Athens Olympics, competing in a breaststroke double. In the 100 m breaststroke, she won the second heat by approximately two seconds ahead of Cuba's Imaday Nuñez Gonzalez in 1:10.66. Her storming victory in the heats missed out a spot in the semifinals, as she finished eighteenth overall by a third of a second (0.33) outside the top-16 field. In her second event, 200 m breaststroke, Kapishina secured a penultimate seed to round out the semifinal roster with a prelims time of 2:31.26, but was eventually disqualified for not following the proper form.

Four years later, Kapishina qualified for her second Belarusian team, as a 23-year-old, at the 2008 Summer Olympics in Beijing. She cleared FINA B-standard entry times of 1:09.16 (100 m breaststroke) and 2:31.02 (200 m breaststroke) from the FINA World Championships in Melbourne, Australia. In the 100 m breaststroke, Kapishina challenged seven other swimmers on the fourth heat, including two-time Olympian Diana Gomes of Portugal. She edged out Turkey's Dilara Buse Günaydın to take the fourth spot by three tenths of a second (0.30) in 1:10.15. Kapishina also won the third heat of the 200 m breaststroke, but missed the semifinals by six hundredths of a second (0.06), in a personal best of 2:27.34.

References

External links
NBC Olympics Profile

1984 births
Living people
Belarusian female breaststroke swimmers
Olympic swimmers of Belarus
Swimmers at the 2004 Summer Olympics
Swimmers at the 2008 Summer Olympics
People from Babruysk
Sportspeople from Mogilev Region